David Proctor (10 October 1929 - September 2011) was a Northern Irish former footballer who made English football league appearances with Norwich City, Barrow and Wrexham.

Career

Proctor started out as a youth at Northern Irish club Portadown before being signed by Blackpool in 1949. 

He would then move to Norwich City, before a short stint with Northwich Victoria.

In 1954 he signed for Barrow, where he was made Captain and he made 160 league appearances in 5 years, before moving to Welsh club Wrexham.

References

1929 births
Association footballers from Northern Ireland
Portadown F.C. players
Blackpool F.C. players
Norwich City F.C. players
Northwich Victoria F.C. players
Barrow A.F.C. players
Wrexham A.F.C. players
2011 deaths
Association football wing halves